Tanvi is a feminine given name which means "the epitome of femininity" or "beautiful" or "slender" in Sanskrit. It is also said that Buddha uses the word `tanvi` to describe a blade of grass, making the word mean delicate, sensitive, or precious. Tanvi is also another name for Goddess Durga. Notable people with the name include:
Tanvi Azmi (born 1960), Indian actress
Tanvi Bhatia (born 1989), Indian actress
Tanvi Ganesh Lonkar (born 1995), Indian actress
Tanvi Shah (born 1982), Indian singer
Tanvi Thakkar (born 1985), Indian actress
Tanvi Vyas (born 1985), Indian actress

Hindu given names
Sanskrit-language names
Indian feminine given names
Indian given names
Persian given names
Nepalese given names
Hindu goddesses
Forms of Parvati
Given names
Telugu names